Ichthyophis paucisulcus, the Siantar caecilian, is a species of amphibian in the family Ichthyophiidae found in Indonesia and Singapore. Its natural habitats are subtropical or tropical moist lowland forests, subtropical or tropical swamps, rivers, intermittent rivers, plantations, rural gardens, heavily degraded former forests, seasonally flooded agricultural land, and canals and ditches.

References

paucisulcus
Amphibians described in 1960
Amphibians of Indonesia
Amphibians of Singapore
Taxonomy articles created by Polbot